is a 1983 action-strategy role-playing video game developed by Kōji Sumii (住井浩司) and released by ASCII for the Sharp X1 computer, followed by ports to the MSX, FM-7, NEC PC-6001, NEC PC-8801 and NEC PC-9801 computer platforms, as well as an altered version released for the Family Computer console and later the Virtual Console service. It revolves around a leader who must lead an army in phalanx formation across a battlefield in real-time against overwhelming enemy forces while freeing and recruiting soldiers along the way, with each unit able to gain experience and level up through battle. The player must make sure that the leader stays alive, until the army reaches the enemy castle to defeat the leader of the opposing forces.

The game was responsible for laying the foundations for the tactical role-playing game genre, or the "simulation RPG" genre as it is known in Japan, with its blend of role-playing and strategy game elements. The game has also variously been described as an early example of an action role-playing game, an early prototype real-time strategy game, and a unique reverse tower defense game. In its time, the game was considered a major success in Japan.

Release
Originally developed in 1983 for the Sharp X1 computer, it won ASCII Entertainment's first "Software Contest" and was sold boxed by them that year. An MSX port was then released in 1984, followed in 1985 by versions for the S1, PC-6000mkII, PC-8801, PC-9801, FM-7 and the Family Computer (the latter released on December 14, 1985).

LOGiN Magazine's November 1984 issue featured a sequel for the X1 entitled New Bokosuka Wars with the source code included. With all-new enemy characters and redesigned items and traps, the level of difficulty became more balanced. It was also included in Tape Login Magazine's November 1984 issue, but never sold in any other form.

The PC-8801 version used to be sold as a download from Enterbrain and was ported for the i-Mode service in 2004. The Famicom version was released for the Wii Virtual Console on April 8, 2008. 

A sequel, Bokosuka Wars II was released in Japan on November 10, 2016 for the PlayStation 4 and Xbox One. A western release was released in February 2017 for Xbox One and October 2017 for PlayStation 4. A Nintendo Switch version was released on March 19, 2020 in Japan.

Plot
In the later Famicom version, King Suren's forces have been captured and turned into trees and rocks by King Ogereth. King Suren has to release his warriors from trees and rocks, and defeat King Ogereth's forces. The allies coming from trees and rocks only appear in the Famicom version.

In the earlier X1, MSX and PC computer versions, however, the player starts with a complete army and may gain some extra knights by freeing them from prison cells, not from trees or rocks. There are no soldiers turned into objects in the original computer versions.

Gameplay
The player can control three chess-like units: the King, Knight, and Pawn. Pressing the D-Pad will move King Suren and his army in the desired direction. Captive soldiers are freed using a knight to break the gates in front of them. In the Famicom version, the player starts the game with only King Suren at 597m, and acquires more allies by bumping against trees, cacti, rocks, and walls using King Suren, which will restore them to their normal form.

Throughout the world of Bokosuka there are obstacles only certain characters can pass. The gates in which Soldiers are locked can only be broken by Knights. Death tiles will kill all characters except Soldiers who will remove them when they step on them. The walls at 500m, 400m, 300m, and 200m can only be broken by King Suren.

When one unit collides with another, a battle takes place. The tile will change to an icon of crossed swords and a then a B (for battle). The victory is automatically calculated by the computer based on the difference between the offensive strengths of the units.

If King Suren dies, the game ends, announcing "WOW! YOU LOSE!". When King Suren succeeds in defeating King Ogreth, the game ends with "BRAVO! YOU WIN!"

The Japanese instruction manual contains the lyrics "Onward, Bokosuka" (すすめボコスカ) to the peculiar game music, written by the programmer himself.

See also
Shamanism - The boxart of the game design was inspired by the Shaman's illustration. Also, King Ogereth was inspired by his appearance by Necromancy and Witchcraft. King Suren was inspired as a folk healer.
Chess

References

External links
darkscarfy.tripod.com
Bokosuka Wars instructions (Translation) on Nintendo's Japanese Virtual Console site

1983 video games
Action role-playing video games
ASCII Corporation games
Japan-exclusive video games
MSX games
Nintendo Entertainment System games
NEC PC-8801 games
NEC PC-6001 games
NEC PC-9801 games
FM-7 games
Role-playing video games
Sharp X1 games
Strategy video games
Tactical role-playing video games
Video games developed in Japan
Virtual Console games